The City is a pioneering short documentary film from 1939 that contrasts the problems of the contemporary urban environment with the superior social and physical conditions that can be provided in a planned community. It was directed and photographed by Ralph Steiner and Willard Van Dyke based on a treatment by Lewis Mumford, which was in turn based on an outline by Pare Lorentz. Aaron Copland  wrote the musical score, and Morris Carnovsky provided the narration.

Summary
The film follows a historical sequence and uses the following locations:
In the Beginning – New England (a rural 18th-century community)
The Industrial city (Pittsburgh)
The Metropolis – Men into Steel (Manhattan)
The Highway – The Endless City (Sunday traffic congestion in New York and New Jersey)
The Green City (Greenbelt, Maryland, and Radburn, New Jersey)
Greenbelt, Maryland, had been constructed a few years earlier as a New Deal project.

Length: 43 minutes and 43 seconds

Production
The film was the idea of Catherine Bauer, an urban planner and public housing advocate. It was produced for the American Institute of Planners (predecessor of the APA) to be shown at the 1939 New York World's Fair as part of the "City of Tomorrow" exhibit. Bauer's original idea was to commission a full-scale mini-neighborhood on a  site to showcase innovative housing design and community planning.  This was to be done in conjunction with MoMA. When the plan was dropped for lack of time and resources, Bauer came up with the idea of the film. Robert Kohn agreed and commissioned it. At the end of 1937, Henwar Rodakiewicz moved to New York to assist Steiner in the production, including participating in writing and editing.

Soundtrack
The score, for narrator and orchestra, was written by Aaron Copland and conducted by Max Goberman. The narrator was the New York stage and Hollywood film actor Morris Carnovsky. Writing in the New York Times  in 2000, Anthony Tommasini described the score as "by turns beguiling and trenchant." In The Los Angeles Times,  Mark Swed has called The City'''s score "an astonishing missing link not only in the genesis of Copland’s Americana style but in American music and cinema." The complete musical score, without narration, was recorded by the PostClassical Ensemble and was issued on CD in 2022.

Legacy
The film was well received when shown at the fair. One study of the fair summarized the film's reception:

In 1998, The City was selected for preservation in the United States National Film Registry by the Library of Congress as being "culturally, historically, or aesthetically significant."

The planned community envisioned in the film— with its attention to scale and shared green space—is sometimes confused by later viewers as representative of suburban development, which was not envisioned when the film was made.

See also
List of films preserved in the United States National Film Registry

References

External linksThe City essay by Kyle Westphal on the National Film Registry web site. The City essay by Daniel Eagan in America's Film Legacy: The Authoritative Guide to the Landmark Movies in the National Film Registry, A&C Black, 2010 , pages 288-290 The City'' in the Prelinger Archives: Part 1, Part 2

1939 documentary films
United States National Film Registry films
Black-and-white documentary films
1930s short documentary films
Documentary films about cities in the United States
Films directed by Willard Van Dyke
Films directed by Ralph Steiner
Films scored by Aaron Copland
1939 compositions
Greenbelt, Maryland
American short documentary films
1939 New York World's Fair
World's fair films
American black-and-white films
1939 films
1930s American films